The 2017–18 Baylor Lady Bears basketball team represented Baylor University in the 2017–18 NCAA Division I women's basketball season. Returning as head coach was Hall of Famer Kim Mulkey for her 18th season. The team played its home games at the Ferrell Center in Waco, Texas and were members of the Big 12 Conference. They finished the season 33–2, 18–0 in Big 12 to win the Big 12 regular season title. They also won the Big 12 women's tournament and earned an automatic bid to the NCAA women's tournament where they defeated Grambling State and Michigan in the first and second rounds before getting upset by Oregon State in the sweet sixteen.

Previous season
For the 2016–17 season, Baylor finished 33–4, 17–1 in the Big 12 to win the regular season title. They advanced to the championship game of the Big 12 women's tournament, where they were upset by West Virginia. They earned an at-large bid to the NCAA women's tournament as a No. 1 seed, where they defeated Texas Southern and California in the first and second rounds, Louisville in the Sweet Sixteen before losing to Mississippi State in the Elite Eight.

Roster

Schedule and results

|-
!colspan=9 style=| Exhibition

|-
!colspan=9 style=| Non-conference regular season

|-
!colspan=9 style=| Big 12 regular season

|-
!colspan=9 style=| Big 12 Women's Tournament

|-
!colspan=9 style= | NCAA Women's Tournament

Source:

Rankings

References

Baylor Bears women's basketball seasons
Baylor
Baylor